Mahinda Amaraweera (Sinhala:මහින්ද අමරවීර,Tamil: மஹிந்த அமரவீர; born 12 February 1962) is a Sri Lankan politician. He is currently the cabinet Minister of Agriculture.  He is also a member of the Parliament of Sri Lanka. for the Hambantota District, as a member of the Sri Lanka People's Freedom Alliance.

Birth and Education 
He was born in a remote village called Udayala in Angunukolapelessa. He received his primary education at Angunukolapalessa primary school and secondary education at Vijitha Central College, Dickwella.

Politics
On 22 May 2017, Amaraweera was appointed Mahaweli Development State Minister.

On 8 March 2016 he was appointed General Secretary of the United People's Freedom Alliance, which was vacated following the death of Wiswa Warnapala.

Family 
He was married to 'Dilrukshika Weerakoon' from Kandy till 2011. In November 2018 he married  'Madushini Prancisku' daughter of Mr and Mrs Prancisku from Weeraketiya. Mr Amaraweera has only one son from his first marriage Pasan Amaraweera who has studied in Royal College Colombo and is currently doing his higher studies in London.

Notes

References

External links
 Mahinda Amaraweera, Parliament directory of members

1962 births
Living people
Members of the 10th Parliament of Sri Lanka
Members of the 12th Parliament of Sri Lanka
Members of the 13th Parliament of Sri Lanka
Members of the 14th Parliament of Sri Lanka
Members of the 15th Parliament of Sri Lanka
Members of the 16th Parliament of Sri Lanka
Government ministers of Sri Lanka
Sri Lanka Freedom Party politicians
United People's Freedom Alliance politicians
People from Southern Province, Sri Lanka
Fisheries ministers of Sri Lanka